The Government frontbench in the Parliament of the United Kingdom, also known as the Treasury Bench, consists of the Cabinet and all other ministers.

Parliamentary opposition to the Government frontbench is provided by the Official Opposition frontbench, the Liberal Democrat frontbench team (when not in government), and the Scottish National Party frontbench team.

Key

Leader of the Government and Cabinet Office

Foreign relations

Law and order

Economy

Social services

Environment

Culture

Transport

Local and devolved government

Parliament

See also 
 Government of the United Kingdom
 Cabinet of the United Kingdom
 Official Opposition frontbench
 Official Opposition Shadow Cabinet (United Kingdom)
 Frontbench Team of Stephen Flynn

References

External links 
Ministerial Appointments: 25 October 2022
Ministerial Appointments: 1 January 2023
Ministerial Appointments: February 2023 

Government of the United Kingdom